Fiona Dolman (born 30 January 1970) is a Scottish actress known for playing Miss Pamela Andrews in the ITV daytime drama series and spinoff to The Royal, The Royal Today, and for the role of Jackie Rosemary Lambert Bradley, PC Mike Bradley's solicitor wife in Heartbeat. She also featured in Channel 4's vampire serial Ultraviolet.

Dolman featured briefly in the BBC show Paradox. She also appeared in the BBC series Waterloo Road in August 2010 as a Police sergeant.

From April 2011 Dolman appears as Sarah Barnaby, wife of DCI John Barnaby and new head teacher at Causton Comprehensive School, in Midsomer Murders. She has also appeared on Lily Savage's Blankety Blank.

In 2019, Dolman successfully completed the London Marathon in memory of her father and raised a substantial amount of money for Hospice UK, for which she is an Ambassador.

References

External links

Scottish television actresses
Living people
People from Findhorn, Moray
1970 births
20th-century Scottish actresses
21st-century Scottish actresses